Brookula murawskii is a species of sea snail, a marine gastropod mollusk, unassigned in the superfamily Seguenzioidea.

Distribution
This species occurs in Cuban part of the Caribbean Sea.

References

murawskii